Herbert Randal Cain III (May 2, 1945 – April 9, 2009) was a Philadelphia soul singer with The Delfonics (early 1960s to 1971). He also helped set up the group Blue Magic.

Life and career 
Cain was born in Philadelphia, Pennsylvania, United States. Growing up, he befriended two brothers, Wilbert and William Hart. During their attendance at Overbrook High School, Cain joined the Harts' existing vocal group, when a couple of its members dropped out.

During his time with the group, The Delfonics won an R&B Grammy in 1970 for "Didn't I (Blow Your Mind This Time)".

Cain left The Delfonics in 1971, with singer Major Harris taking his place in the line-up. In 1973, while working for recording company WMOT Records, Cain helped introduce singer-songwriter Ted Mills to the vocal group Shades of Love, which Mills would join to form Blue Magic.

Death 
Cain died at his home in Maple Shade Township, New Jersey in April 2009, aged 63.

References

External links
New York Times: Randy Cain, Member of Delfonics, Dies at 63

1945 births
2009 deaths
Musicians from Philadelphia
American soul singers
People from Maple Shade Township, New Jersey
Singers from Pennsylvania
20th-century American singers